Isak Kobro Collett (19 January 1867 – 2 September 1911) was a Norwegian politician for the Conservative Party.

Personal life
He was born as the second son of Thomas Collett (1835–1898) and Sine Kobro (1843–1920), in Lindaas where his father was stationed as a county physician. He had one older and two younger brothers. His great-grandfather was Jonas Collett, among the founding fathers of the Norwegian Constitution.

He married Jenny Augusta Arntzen (1875–1951). The couple had six children, some of whom died young.

Career
He took secondary education in Drammen, and graduated as cand.med. in 1894. He was appointed acting county physician (equivalent to Medical Officer for Health) in Modum in 1898. He started a private practice in Eidsvold in 1898, but again became county physician, this time in Ullensaker from 1905.

Involved in politics, he was a member of Eidsvold municipal council, and even deputy mayor for some time.

He served as a deputy representative to the Norwegian Parliament during the term 1910–1912, representing the constituency Øvre Romerike. He did meet in the place of Johan Opsahl, but died midway during the term.

References

1867 births
1911 deaths
Norwegian municipal physicians
Deputy members of the Storting
Conservative Party (Norway) politicians
Akershus politicians